Guillermina Candelario (born August 19, 1979) is a weightlifter from the Dominican Republic. She won three medals during her career at the Pan American Games (1999, 2003 and 2007) in the women's flyweight division (– 48 kg).

Guillermina win the bronze medal at the 2006 Pan American Weightlifting Championships in the under 48 kg category.

References

External links
iwf ranking

1973 births
Living people
Dominican Republic female weightlifters
Weightlifters at the 1999 Pan American Games
Weightlifters at the 2003 Pan American Games
Weightlifters at the 2007 Pan American Games
Pan American Games silver medalists for the Dominican Republic
Pan American Games bronze medalists for the Dominican Republic
Pan American Games medalists in weightlifting
Central American and Caribbean Games silver medalists for the Dominican Republic
Central American and Caribbean Games bronze medalists for the Dominican Republic
Competitors at the 2006 Central American and Caribbean Games
Competitors at the 2010 Central American and Caribbean Games
Central American and Caribbean Games medalists in weightlifting
Medalists at the 2007 Pan American Games
Pan American Weightlifting Championships medalists
20th-century Dominican Republic women
21st-century Dominican Republic women